Vijay Girkar is an Indian politician and member of the Bharatiya Janata Party. Vijay Girkar is a member of the Maharashtra Legislative Council elected by Vidhan Sabha Members quota. He was also a Minister of State of Maharashtra. He is regarded as "Bhai". His spouse Late Shailaja Vijay Girkar was the Deputy Mayor of BrihanMumbai Municipal Corporation.

References 

Politicians from Mumbai
Bharatiya Janata Party politicians from Maharashtra
Members of the Maharashtra Legislative Council
Living people
State cabinet ministers of Maharashtra
21st-century Indian politicians
Year of birth missing (living people)